Ibrahim Shahda (Al-Azizya – , Aix-en-Provence) was a figurative French painter born in Egypt.

Biography 

Born in Al-Azizya, Egypt, Shahda studied at the Cairo Fine Arts Academy in 1947, aged 18. He worked with French professor and painter Pierre Beppi-Martin. In 1955, three years after ending his studies, he won a Prize and organized his first exhibition. At the end of the same year, he decided to leave for Paris.

He applied as free student to the École des Beaux-Arts. He moved to the south of France, in Carpentras, but frequently traveled to Paris.

A first personal exhibition took place in 1958 at the Arlette Chabaud Gallery in Avignon. He won the Painting Prize from the Avignon Festival with La femme en noir, today part of the Fondation Calvet collection (Calvet Museum). He also won the Aix-en-Provence Painting Prize the same year. A second exhibition, shared with his friend Paul Surtel, was organized in Carpentras (Chapelle du Collège) in 1960.

In 1962, unhappy with his work, he chose to return to Paris. In 1963 he visited Italy, then Brittany. In 1966, he returned to Provence, but spent several summers in Brittany.

The following decade saw him visit Belgium, Netherlands, Spain and Italy, and show his work in Paris (Egypt Cultural Center), in Avignon (Ducastel Gallery), in Carpentras (Town-Hall) and in Marseilles. During each trip he visited museums and admired the great masters.

In 1975, Shahda fell seriously ill. He kept on painting, but felt threatened: "One must snatch work from passing time.". During a long remission, he worked on portraits - including those of fellow artists such as painter Michel Bonnaud or writer Pierre Autin-Grenier - and self-portraits, oil or pastel drawing.

Two exhibitions took place in Carpentras in 1981 and 1984. His health deteriorated again in 1985, but he kept on working harder than ever: still lifes, self-portraits and, despite illness and exhaustion, landscapes.

He died from cancer during the summer of 1991 in Aix-en-Provence hospital.

His widow, Anita, organized many posthumous exhibitions, in Paris, in various Provence towns, in Montpellier and in Ajaccio. She worked for years on a monograph which was published in 2014.

Work 

The Fondation Calvet in Avignon owns two paintings by Shahda, La Femme en noir from 1958 and a Self-portrait from the late 70s.

The Auberive Abbey and Musée Comtadin-Duplessis in Carpentras also host some of his work.

His style is highly personal, but has a clear link with some great painters of the past (Frans Hals, Rembrandt, Van Dyck, Goya, Velázquez, Titian and Tintoretto, or van Gogh, Cézanne, Modigliani and Soutine), as well as two of his contemporaries, Zoran Mušič and Francis Bacon, by the strength of his portraits and the refusal of abstract art.

Artists like painters Lucie Geffré and Ronan Barrot and sculptor Marc Petit have been influenced by Shahda's work.

Exhibitions 

 1958 : Galerie Arlette Chabaud, Avignon
 1960 : Chapelle du Collège, Carpentras (exhibition with Paul Surtel)
 1964 : Musée Lapidaire, Carpentras
 1966 : Galerie Ducastel, Avignon
 1967 : Musée Lapidaire, Carpentras
 1969 : Centre Culturel d'Egypte, Paris
 1971 : Galerie Ducastel, Avignon
 1971 : Galerie Lucy Krohg, Paris
 1972 : Hôtel de Ville, Carpentras
 1974 : Galerie Ducastel, Avignon
 1974 : National Fair Club, Marseille
 1975 : Galerie Ducastel, Avignon
 1981 : Musée Duplessis and Chapelle du Collège, Carpentras
 1984 : La Charité, Carpentras

Posthumous exhibitions 

 1993 : Chapelle du Collège, Carpentras
 1994 : Musée Municipal, Alès
 1995 : Château de Malijay, Jonquières
 1998 : Galerie Doudou Bayol, Saint-Rémy-de-Provence
 1998 : Ferme des Arts, Vaison-la-Romaine
 1998 : Centre Culturel d'Egypte, Paris
 1999 : Espace Saint-Louis, Avignon
 2000 : Chapelle du Grozeau, Malaucène
 2003 : Galerie Artset, Limoges
 2006 : Chapelle du Collège, Carpentras
 2009 : Galerie Polad-Hardouin, Paris
 2011 : Galerie Anna-Tschopp, Marseille
 2011 : Galerie Ardital, Aix-en-Provence
 2012 : Galerie de l'Ecusson, Montpellier
 2013 : Lazaret Ollandini, Musée Marc Petit, Ajaccio
 2014 : Imprimerie Rimbaud, Cavaillon, for the monograph publication

Publications 

 1984 : Magazine Rencontres, #124
 2005 : Magazine Azart, #17 
 2009 : Exhibition catalog at Polad-Hardouin Gallery, Ibrahim Shahda, La Rinascita 
 2009 : Magazine Vernissages, #5, Ibrahim Shahda, Chronique d'une Survie
 2014 : Shahda, monograph, by Anita Shahda

 Illustrations
 Pierre Autin-Grenier, Élodie Cordou, une présence, Éditions du Chemin de fer, 2015; with paintings by Ibrahim Shahda

External links 
   Ibrahim Shahda - A painter in the century

Notes and references 

20th-century French painters
20th-century French male artists
French male painters
1929 births
1991 deaths